One More Reason to Forget is a live album by Duluth, Minnesota slowcore group Low, released in 1998. Recorded live to DAT on November 6, 1997 at the Church of Phillip St. Neri, Louisville, Kentucky.

Track listing
"Be There" – 5:35
"Venus" – 4:05
"Condescend" – 4:50
"Landlord" – 6:29
"Over the Ocean" – 4:54
"Do You Know How To Waltz?" – 17:16
"Shame" – 5:02
"If You Were Born Today (Song for Little Baby Jesus)" – 5:25

Low (band) live albums
1998 live albums